Polychrysia is a genus of moths of the family Noctuidae. More commonly known as owlet moths.

Distribution
Polychrysia can be found in Russia, Canada, USA, Europe, and East Asia.

Species
 Polychrysia aurata Staudinger, 1888
 Polychrysia esmeralda Oberthür, 1880
 Polychrysia hampsoni Leech, 1900
 Polychrysia imperatrix Draudt, 1950
 Polychrysia marmorea Ronkay, 1986
 Polychrysia moneta – Golden Plusia Fabricius, 1787
 Polychrysia morigera H. Edwards, 1886
 Polychrysia sica Graeser, 1890
 Polychrysia splendida Butler, 1878

References

External Links 
 Natural History Museum Lepidoptera genus database
 Polychrysia at funet.fi

Plusiinae